Daniel Lobb (died 2019) was a designer of optical instruments and imaging spectrometers.

Education 
For his secondary education, Lobb attended Dorking Grammar School.

Lobb later attended Imperial College London and received a Bachelor of Science in Physics. He then received a Diploma of Imperial College in Optics.

Career 
Lobb worked at the United States Naval Research Laboratory, the Scientific Instrument Research Association, and Surrey Satellite Technology; designing instruments for the European Space Agency and NASA. During his career, Lobb designed laser projector-based flight simulators, optical instruments for satellites, imaging spectrometers for satellites, imaging spectrometers to measure environmental properties (such as water quality and air pollution), and a complex field splitter for James Webb Space Telescope. In 2012, Lobb received an award from the Royal Aeronautical Society for "specialist contributions in aerospace."

Selected publications 

 "New concepts for in-flight characterisation of space-based radiometric instruments." SPIE Volume 3221, Dec 1997.
 "Design of a spectrometer system for Measurements on Earth atmosphere from geostationary orbit." SPIE Volume 5249, Feb 2004.
 "Wide-angle optical systems with moderate spectral resolution, for monitoring the oceans from low Earth orbit." SPIE Volume 5962, September 2005.
 "Experimental measurements for passive athermalization of a satelliteborne MWIR telescope including dn/dT, CTE, and final evaluation." SPIE, Volume 3739, Sept 1999.
 "Imaging Spectrometers for Remote Sensing from Space." Proc. 32nd ESLAB Symposium., Remote Sensing Methodology for Earth Observation and Planetary Exploration, ESTEC, 1998.
 "Theory of concentric designs for grating spectrometers." Applied Optics, Volume 33, Issue 13, May 1994.
 "Imaging spectrometers using concentric optics." SPIE Volume 3118, Oct 1997.
 "Calibration for the Medium Resolution Imaging Spectrometer (MERIS)." SPIE Volume 1493, Aug 1991.
 "Medium Resolution Imaging Spectrometer (MERIS)." SPIE Volume 1490, April 1991.
 "Development of Design Concepts for the Prism (Process Research by an Imaging Space Mission) Instrument." SPIE Volume 2774, Aug 1996.
 "Optical Fabrication and Testing." Proceeding of SPIE/Europto Series. Eds. Roland Geyl, Jonathan Maxwell, September 1999.
 "Integration & Testing of the Compact High-Resolution Imaging Spectrometer (CHRIS)." SPIE Volume 3753, July 1999.
 "PRISM on-board characterisation." SPIE Volume 2957, Jan 1996.
 "Strategies for calibration of high-resolution imaging spectrometer data." SPIE Volume 2957, Jan 1997.
 "Flight Experience of the Compact High Resolution Imaging Spectrometer (CHRIS)." SPIE Volume 5159, Aug 2003.
 "Ratioing methods for in-flight response calibration of space-based spectro-radiometers, operating in the solar spectral region." Proc. ICSO, Toulouse, March 2004.
 "Design of the Compact High-Resolution Imaging Spectrometer (CHRIS), and Future Developments." Proc. ICSO, Toulouse, March 2004.
 "Design and Manufacturing Methods for the Integral Field Unit of the NIRSpec Instrument on JWST." Proc ICSO, ESTEC, 2006.

References 

2019 deaths
Year of birth missing
British scientists